Make the Yuletide Gay is a 2009 American Christmas-themed romantic comedy film written and directed by Rob Williams about a gay college student who is out at school, but is afraid to reveal his sexual orientation to his parents. It stars Keith Jordan as Gunn, and Adamo Ruggiero as Gunn's boyfriend and roommate, Nathan. Kelly Keaton and Derek Long star as Anya and Sven, Gunn's parents, while Hallee Hirsh appears as Abby, Gunn's high school girlfriend.

Make the Yuletide Gay premiered at the Inside Out Toronto LGBT Film and Video Festival on May 17, 2009.

The title of the film comes from a line in the 1944 song Have Yourself a Merry Little Christmas, written by Hugh Martin and Ralph Blane.

Cast 
 Keith Jordan as Olaf "Gunn" Gunnunderson: Gunn is a college student who is openly gay at school. Back at home, his parents, neighbors, and high school friends think that he is straight. Gunn is afraid that his parents will stop loving him if they find out that he is gay.  When he goes home for Christmas, he has to change the way he dresses and his personal mannerisms in order to maintain his heterosexual façade.
 Adamo Ruggiero as Nathan Stanford: Nathan, an openly gay college student from a wealthy family on the Upper East Side, is Gunn's boyfriend and dorm roommate. Unlike Gunn, Nathan is completely open about his sexuality, including with his parents.
 Hallee Hirsh as Abby Mancuso: Abby lives across the street from Gunn, and they had a brief romantic relationship while they were in high school.  
 Kelly Keaton as Anya Gunnunderson: Anya is Gunn's jovial, happy-go-lucky mother.  She grew up in Wisconsin and is a housewife.
 Derek Long as Sven Gunnunderson: Sven is Gunn's forgetful, pot-smoking father.  He grew up in Minnesota and is a professor at the local college.
 Alison Arngrim as Heather Mancuso: Heather is Abby's mother.  Heather and Anya pretend to be friends, but they secretly despise each other.
 Ian Buchanan as Peter Stanford and Gates McFadden as Martha Stanford: Peter and Martha are Nathan's wealthy, emotionally detached parents.  They decide to go on a cruise, leaving Nathan all alone for Christmas.

Awards

Home media release
Make the Yuletide Gay was released on DVD on November 10, 2009.

Book and sequel
In 2017 Rob Williams published the book based on the film, Make The Yuletide Gay: The Novel . Now, with this novel, fans can learn more about the Gunnunderson, Stanford and Mancuso families, gain more insight into Gunn’s journey over that fateful holiday week, and even find out what happens afterwards. Included in this book is a new short story When Olaf Met Nathan, which details the first meeting between the two college freshmen, randomly assigned as roommates but destined to become much more.

In 2018 he released a (not yet filmed) sequel Make The Yuletide Gay 2: The Novel . Years have passed since the fateful Christmas dinner when Gunn came out to his wacky yet loving parents. Gunn and Nathan have maintained a long-term, long-distance relationship due to Nathan's career choices and Gunn's graduate education. Now that they’re living in the same city and both teaching at the same college where Gunn's father Sven works, Gunn and Nathan are planning a Christmas wedding! Unfortunately, not everything is going as planned...

See also
 List of lesbian, gay, bisexual, or transgender-related films by storyline

References

External links
 
 
 

2009 films
2009 romantic comedy films
American Christmas films
American independent films
American romantic comedy films
American LGBT-related films
Gay-related films
LGBT-related romantic comedy films
2009 LGBT-related films
2000s English-language films
2000s American films